Dix Hills is a hamlet and census-designated place (CDP) on Long Island in the town of Huntington in Suffolk County, New York. The population was 26,892 at the 2010 census.

In the past, Dix Hills and some of its neighbors have proposed incorporating as the Incorporated Village of Half Hollow Hills. These proposals were all mothballed.

History 
Settlers traded goods with the Indigenous Secatogue tribe for the land that became Dix Hills in 1699. The Secatogues lived in the northern portion of the region during the later half of that century. The land was known as Dick's Hills. By lore, the name traces to a local native named Dick Pechegan, likely of the Secatogues. Scholar William Wallace Tooker wrote that the addition of the English name "Dick" to the indigenous name "Pechegan" was a common practice. 

Tooker wrote that Pechegan's wigwam and his planted fields became the hilly area's namesake, known as the shortened "Dix Hills" by 1911. The area was mostly used for farming until after World War II.

In the 1950s, Dix Hills and its neighbors Wyandanch and Melville, along with the area known as Sweet Hollow, proposed to incorporate as a single village. The plans were unsuccessful, and these areas would remain unincorporated.

Proposals were revived around 2001, when Dix Hills, Melville, Wheatley Heights, and East Farmingdale (all within the school district) proposed incorporating as a single village. These plans also failed and each remain unincorporated hamlets to this day.

Geography

Dix Hills is located centrally on Long Island, on the southern edge of Huntington, bordering the town of Babylon. 

The Long Island Expressway passes almost straight through the middle of the hamlet.

Demographics 

As of the census of 2000, there were 26,892 people, 7,952 households, and 7,236 families residing in the CDP. The population density was 1,632.1 per square mile (630.0/km2). There were 8,057 housing units at an average density of 505.3/sq mi (195.0/km2). The racial makeup of the CDP was 86.71% White, 3.25% African American, 0.05% Native American, 7.36% Asian, 0.02% Pacific Islander, 0.84% from other races, and 1.77% from two or more races. Hispanic or Latino of any race were 3.82% of the population.

There were 7,952 households, out of which 44.8% had children under the age of 18 living with them, 82.1% were married couples living together, 6.1% had a female householder with no husband present, and 9.0% were non-families. 7.1% of all households were made up of individuals, and 3.0% had someone living alone who was 65 years of age or older. The average household size was 3.25 and the average family size was 3.39.

In the CDP, the population was spread out, with 28.5% under the age of 18, 5.5% from 18 to 24, 27.1% from 25 to 44, 28.8% from 45 to 64, and 10.1% who were 65 years of age or older. The median age was 39 years. For every 100 females, there were 98.2 males. For every 100 females age 18 and over, there were 94.7 males.

According to a 2007 estimate, the median income for a household in the CDP was $137,632, and the median income for a family was $150,271. Males had a median income of over $100,000 versus $72,361 for females. The per capita income for the CDP was $93,426. About 2.1% of families and 1.9% of the population were below the poverty line, including 3.1% of those under age 18 and 2.2% of those age 65 or over.

Education
Dix Hills is served by the Half Hollow Hills Central School District and the Commack School District. The Half Hollow Hills elementary schools are Otsego, Paumanok, Signal Hill, Sunquam, and Vanderbilt. 

Middle schools that serve the district are Candlewood Middle School and West Hollow Middle School. The high schools are Half Hollow Hills High School East and Half Hollow Hills High School West. Commack Middle School and Rolling Hills Elementary are both a part of the Commack School District and are located within Dix Hills. 

Five Towns College is also located within Dix Hills.

Dix Hills is part of the Half Hollow Hills Community Library.

Emergency services

Dix Hills is served by the Dix Hills Fire Department, through three stations. The Dix Hills Fire Department's headquarters (Company 2) is located on Deer Park Avenue, immediately north of the Northern State Parkway. Substation #1 (Company 3) is located on Deer Park Avenue, south of the Long Island Expressway. 

Substation #2 (Company 1) is located on Carll's Straight Path, about half of a mile south of the Long Island Expressway. The Dix Hills Fire Department consists of approximately 150 volunteer firefighters and emergency medical technicians who respond to over 2,500 calls for assistance each year – ranging from fires to motor vehicle accidents to medical and traumatic emergencies.

Notable people

 Brian Bloom, actor
 Bob Bourne, NHL player
 Gidone Busch, New York City Police Department shooting victim
 John Coltrane, jazz saxophonist and composer (John Coltrane Home)
 Clark Gillies, NHL player
 Tobias Harris, NBA player
 Steve Israel, former New York congressman
 Mark LoMonaco of The Dudley Boyz, pro wrestler
 Ralph Macchio of The Karate Kid, actor
 Kyle Merber, professional runner 
 Cathy Moriarty, actress
 Greg Mottola, writer-director of Superbad
 Todd Phillips, writer-director of Old School and The Hangover
 Samantha Prahalis, WNBA basketball player
 Michael Prywes, writer-director
 Jenna Rose, entertainer
 Dee Snider, Twisted Sister frontman
 Ryan Star, singer-songwriter
 Wesley Walker, NFL player
 Debbie Wasserman Schultz, Congresswoman, former chair of the Democratic National Convention, Hills East '84
 Chris Weidman, UFC fighter
 Judd Winick, cartoonist
Gary Wood (1942–1994), NFL quarterback

Notes

References

External links 

 Dix Hills Performing Arts Center @ Five Towns College

Huntington, New York
Census-designated places in New York (state)
Census-designated places in Suffolk County, New York